An emission test cycle is a protocol contained in an emission standard to allow repeatable and comparable measurement of exhaust emissions for different engines or vehicles. Test cycles specify the specific conditions under which the engine or vehicle is operated during the emission test. There are many different test cycles issued by various national and international governments and working groups. Specified parameters in a test cycle include a range of operating temperature, speed, and load. Ideally these are specified so as to accurately and realistically represent the range of conditions under which the vehicle or engine will be operated in actual use. Because it is impractical to test an engine or vehicle under every possible combination of speed, load, and temperature, this may not actually be the case. Vehicle and engine manufacturers may exploit the limited number of test conditions in the cycle by programming their engine management systems to control emissions to regulated levels at the specific test points contained in the cycle, but create a great deal more pollution under conditions experienced in real operation but not represented in the test cycle. This results in real emissions higher than the standards are supposed to allow, undermining the standards and public health.

Application
Emission test cycles are typical tests for research and development activities on engines at automobile OEMs. 
The commonly used hardware platforms therefore are:
 engine test stand - for just a single engine
 vehicle test stand (also "chassis dynamometer" or "chassis dyno" or "emission dyno") - for the complete car with engine
 ASM Test - Accelerated Simulation Mode: (California inspections) Vehicles tested at 15 MPH & 25 MPH where vehicle undergoes a load.

References

See also

Emission standards
Engine test stand
Vehicle inspection

Automotive technologies
Pollution control technologies